Elmwood Cemetery, also known historically as the Poor Farm Cemetery, is a historic cemetery at Zero and South 24th Streets in Fort Smith, Arkansas. Established in 1891, it is on the grounds of Sebastian County's first poor farm, purchased by the county in 1890. It remained in use at least into the 1940s, and is the only surviving visible element of the poor farm. The cemetery contains several hundred graves, although only seven have markers.

The cemetery was listed on the National Register of Historic Places in 2018.

See also

 National Register of Historic Places listings in Sebastian County, Arkansas

References

External links
 

Cemeteries on the National Register of Historic Places in Arkansas
Buildings and structures completed in 1891
Buildings and structures in Fort Smith, Arkansas
Protected areas of Sebastian County, Arkansas
National Register of Historic Places in Sebastian County, Arkansas
Cemeteries established in the 1890s